Ocinaropsis is a monotypic moth genus in the family Lasiocampidae erected by Per Olof Christopher Aurivillius in 1905. Its single species, Ocinaropsis obscura, described by the same author in the same year, is found in KwaZulu-Natal, South Africa.

References

Endemic moths of South Africa
Lasiocampidae
Monotypic moth genera